Percey Franklyn Smith (21 August 1867 – 1956) was an American mathematician and professor of mathematics at Sheffield Scientific School of Yale University.

Smith was born in Nyack, New York.  He studied mathematics at Sheffield Scientific School of Yale college, finishing the regular course in 1888 and receiving the Doctor of Philosophy in 1891. Starting in 1888 he was instructor for mathematics in Yale until 1894, followed by academic studies in Germany and France at the universities of Göttingen, Berlin, Paris. After returning to Yale in 1896 he was assistant professor of mathematics until 1900, then professor until 1936.

He wrote several papers related to Lie sphere geometry, and is the author of several textbooks such as The elements of analytic geometry (1904), New analytic geometry (1912), Theoretical mechanics (1910).

The title "Percey F. Smith Professor of Mathematics" is still used in Yale. He was a member of the Connecticut Academy of Arts and Sciences.

Publications (selection)

References 

19th-century American mathematicians
20th-century American mathematicians
1867 births
1956 deaths
Yale University alumni
Yale University faculty
People from Nyack, New York
Mathematicians from New York (state)